A diadem is a type of crown.

Diadem may also refer to:

Maritime
 , several vessels of the Royal Navy
 Diadem (ship), several merchant vessels

Arts and entertainment
 Diadem (board game), a 1981 science fiction game
 The Diadem Saga, a science fiction series by Jo Clayton
 "Diadems", a song by Megadeth on the soundtrack for the film Demon Knight
 "Diadem", a tune used for the hymn "All Hail the Power of Jesus' Name"

Animals
 Diademed monkey
 Diadem roundleaf bat
 Mograbin diadem snake
 Diadem spider
 Diadems, the butterfly genus Hypolimnas
 Diadem (horse), a 20th-century Thoroughbred racehorse

Other uses
 Diadem (star), a star in the constellation Coma Berenices
 Operation Diadem, a military operation in World War II's Italian Campaign
 Diadem Peak, a mountain in Alberta, Canada
 DIAdem, a technical software for managing, analyzing, and reporting technical data from National Instruments

See also
 Diadema (disambiguation)